Bard College at Simon's Rock (more commonly known as Simon's Rock) is a private residential liberal arts college in Great Barrington, Massachusetts. It is a unit of Bard College, which is located in Annandale-on-Hudson, New York.

The school is an "early college", designed for students to enroll immediately after completing the tenth or eleventh grade, rather than after graduating from high school. Simon's Rock is the only accredited four-year early college to date and still the only college or university to take this approach with all of its students. It is one of a number of early college entrance programs that provide opportunities for students to enter college one or more years ahead of their traditional high school graduation date. A majority of students transfer to larger institutions after receiving an Associate of Arts degree after two years, although many stay for four to receive a Bachelor of Arts.

History

The college's founder, Elizabeth Blodgett Hall, had formerly been a private girls' school headmistress at Concord Academy. She concluded from her experience, and that of her colleagues, that for many students the latter two years of high school are wasted on repetitious and overly constrained work. Many young students, she thought, are ready to pursue college-level academic work some time before the usual system asks it of them.
When envisioning the college in the early 1960s, Elizabeth Blodgett Hall deliberately named it nothing more than "Simon's Rock." Her reasoning for this was that even she did not know if it would be a high school, a college, or something else.

Simon's Rock was officially founded in 1964. From 1964 to 1970, the buildings of the campus were built on Great Pine Farm, a farm that was owned by Hall's family. These buildings were the college center, the library, the classroom buildings, three dormitories (now dormitories primarily for first-year students: Crosby, Dolliver, and Kendrick) and the dining hall. Some of the farm's buildings, such as Hall's own home, were incorporated into the college campus as well. Hall was the president of the college at its founding.

In 1966, the first class, all women, were admitted to Simon's Rock. These women, along with some of the other early classes, went through a four-year program that resulted in the associate's degree, at which point students desiring a further degree would have to transfer to another school. This differs from the current system, in which students receive an associate degree typically after two years, and a bachelor's degree after four years of study.

The year 1970 saw both the first commencement ceremonies at Simon's Rock as well as the first coeducational entering class.

Hall retired as Simon's Rock's president in 1972 after students organized a vote of no confidence, handing the post off to Baird W. Whitlock, whose presidency ended in 1977. Though only serving for five years, Whitlock was very influential to Simon's Rock's development. He oversaw a complete change in the associate's program, which was condensed into two years, eliminating the high school components. He also oversaw the beginning of the bachelor's degree program, which was accredited in 1974 by the New England Association of Schools and Colleges.

Samuel McGill was Simon's Rock's president from 1977 to 1979, at which point Bard College became affiliated with Simon's Rock. The acquisition was completed as an attempt to bring Simon's Rock out of the major financial struggle it was experiencing. At the time that Simon's Rock was looking for a school to acquire it, some of the possible schools included Boston University and Yale University. The Bard acquisition took about one month from start to finish. This made Leon Botstein, the president of Bard, the ex officio president of Simon's Rock, and he still holds both offices today.

In 1981, with the help of various donors, Simon's Rock purchased the  Upper Campus, a former seminary three-quarters of a mile uphill from the original Simon's Rock campus. This added a gymnasium, chapel and various forms of housing to Simon's Rock's assets.

In 1989, an arts and humanities building was built directly across Alford Road, near the college's other arts buildings. In the same year, the student union was established in the lower level of the dining hall.

On December 14, 1992, a shooting occurred at Simon's Rock College. At around 10:30 pm, Wayne Lo, a student at the school, shot and killed one student and one professor, and wounded three students and a security guard. His SKS rifle soon jammed and Lo later surrendered to authorities without further incident. The people killed in the shooting were 18-year-old Galen Gibson and 37-year-old Ñacuñán Saez.

In 1993, the then-unused chapel from upper campus was relocated to the main part of campus and renovated, becoming the college's music building. That same year, a number of the campus's arts and dormitory buildings were also renovated.

Since then, many buildings have been built or renovated. These include the Fisher Science and Academic Center (completed 1998), the Kilpatrick Athletic Center (completed 1999), the Daniel Arts Center (completed 2005), an apartment-like dormitory for upperclassmen (Pibly House, completed 2000), the Livingston Hall Student Union (completed 2006), and others.

In 2000, Simon's Rock became the first college in the United States to officially recognize International Workers' Day.

In 2001, Simon's Rock was instrumental in the founding of Bard High School Early College (BHSEC) in Manhattan. There are now seven Bard Early College programs located in New York, Newark, Cleveland, Baltimore, and New Orleans.

On April 11, 2006, part of Carriage House, a residence in upper campus, burned in an electrical fire in the early morning. No one was hurt in the incident, but some student possessions were partially or entirely destroyed. The remnants of the building were burnt down by the Great Barrington Fire Department in January 2009 in a training exercise.

In 2015, Simon's Rock founded Bard Academy at Simon's Rock, a two-year high school program leading into the Lower College program.

Location
Simon's Rock is located on a 275-acre (1.1-km²) campus in Great Barrington, a small town (pop. 7,500) in the Berkshires region of Massachusetts. The town of Great Barrington is neighbored by the towns of Lee, Stockbridge and West Stockbridge to the north, Alford and Egremont to the west, Sheffield and New Marlborough to the south, and Monterey and Tyringham to the east.

Academics
Faculty at Bard College at Simon's Rock are primarily appointed to one of the following four academic divisions: the Division of the Arts, the Division of Languages and Literature, the Division of Science, Mathematics and Computing, and the Division of Social Studies. Students may also hold one of several concentrations available under Interdivisional Studies.

Over 40 concentrations are available, including art history, Asian studies, chemistry, mathematics, physics, and theater. The school offers study abroad and independent study opportunities, as well as a 3/2 dual-degree program with Columbia University for those who wish to pursue engineering. Similar programs are available with Dartmouth College and Washington University in St. Louis. Students are encouraged to spend one or more terms at Lincoln College or St Catherine's College in the University of Oxford, or at other institutions during their time as a Simon's Rock enrollee.

While many students receive associate degrees after two years and transfer to other institutions, around half stay and moderate into the Simon's Rock B.A. program. Those who wish to remain eligible for a bachelor's degree must complete senior theses, which become professionally printed, archived, and remain available to the public in the Alumni Library.

Classes are discussion-oriented, with lecture based offerings. The system is predicated on the idea that the students bring as much value to the class as the professors. In fact, orientation for incoming students is a mandatory week-long writing and thinking workshop, designed to readjust students to pedagogical, cooperative bidirectional learning.

It is a school policy that teachers are referred to on a first-name basis. For example, students do not refer to the former dean as "Dr. Bernard Rodgers," but instead call him "Bernie." Professors never receive tenure as a matter of policy.

There are only about 400 students (though due to its small size, large fluctuations in class enrollment and admissions are common), resulting in a very low student-to-faculty ratio, around 8:1. Few classes have more than 15 students; none have more than 30. Some classes have as few as three students, and independent study or tutorial courses in which one student works closely with a professor are common.

Student life

Athletics
The llama is the mascot of Bard College at Simon's Rock, due to the proximity of the college soccer fields to Seekonk Veterinary Hospital, a veterinary clinic that, at one time, had a llama pasture. Interscholastic sports offered at the school include soccer, basketball, and swimming.

All students at Simon's Rock are required to fulfill athletic requirements through the Active Community Engagement (ACE) Program. ACE courses include traditional gym classes, such as martial arts, swimming lessons, weight training, and so on, but extend to things like bowling, dodgeball, hackeysack, gardening, and scuba diving.

Housing
The vast majority of students at Simon's Rock live on-campus, and all students (except those with local families) are required to live on-campus during their first two years, with some exceptions.

Nine dormitories are currently used to house students.

 Crosby House is a women's dormitory.
 Dolliver House is a men's dormitory.
 Kendrick House is a coeducational dormitory. Crosby, Dolliver and Kendrick are known as the "Tri- Dorms." They are predominantly for first-year students.
 Hill House is a coeducational dormitory for sophomores, juniors, and seniors. A portion of Hill house is used to home the students of Bard Academy. 
Pibly House, Carriage House, and The Cottage are on Upper Campus, a portion of the campus that is about 3/4-mile uphill from the main section of the campus. Other buildings on Upper Campus include the provost's house and the Annex (a small building that houses staff).  
 Carriage House is a relatively new dormitory, built in 2009 on the site where the former Carriage House stood. The majority of Carriage House was destroyed in a fire in 2005, and the remains stood until 2009. The remnants of the building were burnt down by the Great Barrington Fire Department as a training exercise. The new dormitory is primarily used for sophomores and some upperclassmen.
 Pibly House is a coeducational dormitory, consisting of eight two- or three-bedroom apartments for juniors and seniors.
The Annex has a single coeducational four-bedroom apartment for juniors and seniors. It was used as student housing in 2008-2009 and opened to students again starting in 2015.
 The Owl's Nest, formerly a gathering space for students belonging to minority identity groups or organizations, came into use to house students in the Fall 2016 semester due to high housing demand.
 The Cottage has been used as coeducational housing for three to five non-first-year students since 2007. Before 2007, it was mainly used for staff members.

Several dormitories are no longer in use as student housing, and Simon's Rock has used many other buildings as student housing over the years. 
 The Foster Houses (colloquially known as "The Mods") are a set of 12 townhouses, each built to house four non-first-year students. After the 2010–2011 academic year the Foster Houses were closed for long-term renovation, The Mods reopened for students housing in the fall of 2017.  
 The Orchard Houses can each house five to seven non-first-years. Of the three that were built, two currently house staff members and their families. Orchard 3, is currently used to house upperclassmen students.  
 Red Brick House and Checker Chance are two dorms that housed small numbers of non-first year students in house style during 2008–2009. They are located across the street from the main section of campus, on Hurlburt road. Use of these houses was discontinued during the 2009–2010 school year. 
 During the Fall 2008 semester the College also provided overflow student housing at the nearby Days Inn hotel.

Name

The name "Simon's Rock" comes from a large rock, a glacial erratic, currently in the woods on the campus, a short walk from the main part of the campus. At the time that Simon's Rock earned its name (in the early 1920s), the woods that now surround it were part of the vast area of land called Great Pine Farm. The rock was a favorite spot for people who lived nearby, especially children. One neighborhood child, a little girl named Simon, claimed the rock as her own. Throughout its short history, the college has gone through names such as "Simon's Rock," "Simon's Rock Early College," "Simon's Rock of Bard College" (for a period after 1979, when it was acquired by Bard College) and "Simon's Rock College of Bard". In 2006, it was announced that the school would once again change its name, making it "Bard College at Simon's Rock" as of August 2007 Vice President and Provost Mary Marcy said that the reasons for the change include an effort "to be more clear about identity" and "to be very clear about the Bard College system."

Notable alumni and faculty

Alumni
Henry Alford, writer
Loren AliKhan, attorney, judge on the District of Columbia Court of Appeals
Solange Ashby, egyptologist
Amanda Baggs, activist
Alison Bechdel, creator of the comic Dykes To Watch Out For and graphic novel Fun Home
Veronica Chambers, writer
Mark Clifford, former Editor-in-Chief of the South China Morning Post
Joel and Ethan Coen, Academy Award-winning filmmakers
Brenda Cullerton, writer
Martin Dosh, musician
Mike Doughty, singer/songwriter, founder of the band Soul Coughing
Daisy Eagan, actress
Ronan Farrow, journalist (son of Mia Farrow and Woody Allen)
Henry Ferrini, documentary filmmaker
Annie Finch, poet
Tom Ford, fashion designer, filmmaker
Abby Franquemont, writer, revivalist of the art of hand spinning with the spindle
Nat Gertler, writer
Maria Giese, film director and screenwriter
Ben Goertzel, artificial intelligence researcher
I. W. Gregorio, surgeon and YA author best known for None of the Above
Meg Hutchinson, singer-songwriter
Julie Introcaso née Johnson, NH Circuit Court Judge
Tokata Iron Eyes, Native American activist
Sarah Rose Karr, actress most known for her role as Emily Newton in Beethoven and Beethoven's 2nd
Jasmine Krotkov, retired postal worker and member of the Montana House of Representatives
Michael S. Kurth, better known as Curse
Mark Leiter, Chief Strategy Officer at Nielsen
Jah Levi, musician
Roman Mars, radio producer of the podcast 99% Invisible
Zachary Mason, writer, known for his debut work The Lost Books of the Odyssey.
John McWhorter, linguist and social commentator
Raj Mukherji, NJ state legislator and technology entrepreneur
Ada Palmer, novelist, historian and University of Chicago professor
Eli Pariser, Executive Director, MoveOn.org Political Action
Susan May Pratt, actress
Ann Reid, scientist and science education advocate.
Claire Rosen, artist
Jan Staller, photographer
Lee Stranahan, writer for Russian state media
Kazys Varnelis, historian of architecture

Faculty
Karen Allen, adjunct Faculty in the Arts, actress
Nancy Bonvillain, professor of Anthropology and Linguistics, specializes in Native American cultures and languages
Edgar Chamorro, former Professor of Spanish and Latin, former leader of the Nicaraguan Contras
Emmanuel Dongala, professor of Chemistry and Richard B. Fisher Chair in Natural Sciences, novelist
Peter Filkins, literary translator and poet
David LaBerge, former adjunct faculty in psychology and biology 
Okey Ndibe, novelist
David Spadafora, former professor of history

References

External links

Bard College at Simon's Rock
The Llama Ledger, Simon's Rock's student newspaper

Bard College
 01
Liberal arts colleges in Massachusetts
Universities and colleges in Berkshire County, Massachusetts
Gifted education
Great Barrington, Massachusetts
Educational institutions established in 1964
1964 establishments in Massachusetts
Private universities and colleges in Massachusetts